In the United States, an SR-22 (sometimes referred to as a certificate of insurance or a financial responsibility filing) is a vehicle liability insurance document required by most state Department of Motor Vehicles (DMV) offices for "high-risk" insurance policies. An SR-22 is not an insurance policy, but a filing, or an add-on, that is added to a personal automobile liability insurance policy. Not all insurance carriers offer SR-22 filings in all territories. For instance, an insurer may offer traditional base coverage in a particular state but not issue an SR-22 in that state.

A DMV may require an SR-22 from a driver to reinstate his or her driving privileges following an uninsured car accident or conviction of another traffic-related offense, such as a DUI. An SR-22 may be required for three years for conviction of driving without insurance or driving with a suspended license and up to five years for a DUI. If an SR-22 should expire or be canceled, the insurance company is required to issue an SR-26 form, which certifies the cancellation of the policy.

Some states accept an SR-22 as an alternative to a deposit in cash or security as proof of financial responsibility. In Arizona, for instance, a driver seeking reinstatement under some circumstances may submit an SR-22 in lieu of depositing $40,000 in cash or certificates of deposit.

See also 
 Automobile safety
 Drunk driving in the United States
 National Traffic and Motor Vehicle Safety Act
 Uniform Vehicle Code

Notes

References 

Vehicle law
Auto insurance in the United States
Legal documents
Driving under the influence